Oyuntuya Oyunbold (born 11 November 2001) is a Mongolian professional footballer who currently plays as a right back for Hong Kong Premier League club Sham Shui Po and the Mongolian national team.

Club career

Futsal
As a youth Oyunbold played futsal for Mongoliin Temuulel FC. In 2020 he was the league's top scorer with seventy-three goals en route to winning the Best Male Player Award at the Mongolian Football Federation's annual Golden Ball Ceremony. His seventy-three goal total included a league-record twenty goals in a single match.

Football
In 2019, Oyunbold played for Mongoliin Temuulel FC during the inaugural Mongolia Second League season. The club finished third in the table as Oyunbold was tied for second-best scorer in the league with seven goals.

In July following the 2019 season, he joined the academy of SP Falcons of the Mongolian Premier League on a one-year loan. In March 2021, halfway through the 2021 Premier League season, Oyunbold returned to SP Falcons and signed for the first team on a five-year deal. During his first partial top-flight season, he scored four goals and tallied four assists. 

In September 2022, he left SP Falcons and joined Hong Kong Premier League club Sham Shui Po. By doing so, he became the first-ever Mongolian player to sign for a club in Hong Kong. He made his league debut for the club on 18 September 2022 as a second-half substitute against Kitchee.

International career
Oyunbold was part of Mongolia's squad that competed in 2020 AFC U-19 Championship qualification. In the final match of the group stage he scored two goals in a 4–3 victory over Guam. He was called up to the youth squad again in October 2021 as Mongolia hosted its group in 2022 AFC U-23 Asian Cup qualification. He scored in his nation's 2–3 loss to Laos to close out Mongolia's campaign.

He made his senior international debut on 23 March 2022 in a friendly against Laos. He went on to make his competitive debut on 14 June 2022 in a 2–0 2023 AFC Asian Cup qualification victory over Yemen.

Career statistics

International

Club

References

External links

Hong Kong FA profile
MFF profile

2001 births
Living people
Mongolian footballers
Mongolian expatriate footballers
Association football midfielders
Association football defenders
Mongolia international footballers
Hong Kong Premier League players
Mongolian National Premier League players
SP Falcons players
Sham Shui Po SA players
Expatriate footballers in Hong Kong